Andreas Drakos Christofides (born 14 October 1992) is a Cypriot professional footballer who played as a centre back for Nea Salamina in the Cypriot First Division.

Career

APOEL
Christofides is a product of APOEL Academies. He was promoted to the first team in the 2011–12 season, but he didn't made any official appearance until the end of the 2012–13 season.

In July 2013, he joined Alki Larnaca on a season-long loan deal from APOEL, in order to gain valuable first team experience. During his loan spell, Christofides was a regular starter for Alki, appearing in 20 league matches.

On 4 June 2014, he returned to APOEL and signed a one-year contract extension with the club. He made his official APOEL debut on 28 January 2015, playing the full 90 minutes in his team's 3–0 home win against Olympiakos Nicosia for the Cypriot Cup. During 2014–15 season, Christofides appeared only in three matches in all competitions, but he managed to win his first career titles, as APOEL won both the Cypriot championship and the cup.

On 28 May 2015, four days after winning the double with APOEL, the team announced that Christofides was leaving the club as his contract would not be renewed.

Olympiakos Nicosia

In June 2015 he signed for fellow Nicosia club Olympiakos Nicosia.

AE Sias 

After an extended career break, in July 2022 Christofides joined the Champions and Cup Winners of Poel's B Division, AE Sias.

Career statistics

Club

Honours
APOEL
Cypriot First Division (1): 2014–15
Cypriot Cup (1): 2014–15

References

External links
 APOEL official profile
 
 UEFA Profile

1992 births
Living people
Greek Cypriot people
Sportspeople from Nicosia
Cypriot footballers
Association football defenders
Cypriot First Division players
APOEL FC players
Olympiakos Nicosia players